Lumda may refer to:

Lumda (Grünberg), a district of the town Grünberg, Hesse, Germany
Lumda (river), a river in Hesse, Germany, tributary of the Lahn